Minden-Lübbecke I is an electoral constituency (German: Wahlkreis) represented in the Bundestag. It elects one member via first-past-the-post voting. Under the current constituency numbering system, it is designated as constituency 134. It is located in eastern North Rhine-Westphalia, comprising most of the Minden-Lübbecke district.

Minden-Lübbecke I was created for the inaugural 1949 federal election. Since 2017, it has been represented by Achim Post of the Social Democratic Party (SPD).

Geography
Minden-Lübbecke I is located in eastern North Rhine-Westphalia. As of the 2021 federal election, it comprises the entirety of the Minden-Lübbecke district excluding the municipality of Bad Oeynhausen.

History
Minden-Lübbecke I was created in 1949, then known as Minden – Lübbecke. From 1965 through 1976, it was named Minden. From 1980 through 1994, it was named Minden-Lübbecke. In the 1998 election, it was named Minden-Lübbecke II. It acquired its current name in the 2002 election. In the 1949 election, it was North Rhine-Westphalia constituency 51 in the numbering system. From 1953 through 1961, it was number 110. From 1965 through 1976, it was number 108. From 1980 through 1998, it was number 104. From 2002 through 2009, it was number 135. Since 2013, it has been number 134.

Originally, the constituency comprised the districts of Minden and Lübbecke. In the 1976 through 1994 elections, it was coterminous with the Minden-Lübbecke district. In the 1998 election, it lost the Ortsteile of Bad Oeynhausen-Lohe and Bad Oeynhausen-Rehme. It acquired its current borders in the 2002 election.

Members
The constituency has been held by the Social Democratic Party (SPD) during all but two Bundestag terms since 1949. It was first represented by Paul Bleiß of the SPD from 1949 to 1965, followed by Friedrich Schonhofen until 1976. Lothar Ibrügger then served from 1976 to 2009, a total of nine consecutive terms. Steffen Kampeter of the Christian Democratic Union (CDU) won the constituency in 2009, and was re-elected in 2013. Achim Post regained it for the SPD in 2017 and was re-elected in 2021.

Election results

2021 election

2017 election

2013 election

2009 election

References

Federal electoral districts in North Rhine-Westphalia
1949 establishments in West Germany
Constituencies established in 1949
Minden-Lübbecke